The Town of Bristol is a former town in Kenosha County, Wisconsin, United States. The population was 4,538 at the 2000 census—before a portion of the town was incorporated as the Village of Bristol. The remainder of the Town of Bristol was annexed by the Villages of Bristol and Pleasant Prairie effective July 4, 2010, and the town ceased to exist.

History
The Bristol area's first settler was Rollin Tuttle, who arrived in April 1830; Levi Grant arrived the following month.

Border dispute
The Town of Bristol was involved in annexation disputes with Pleasant Prairie during the 1990s. The two entities reached a boundary agreement in 1997; as a result, the Circuit Court of Kenosha County dismissed motions by Pleasant Prairie to annex portions of the town.

Dis-establishment
In 1968, a state court denied the Town of Bristol's earlier petition to incorporate itself as a village.

On January 19, 2009, a state court rejected an attempt by the western half of Bristol to incorporate, which had been filed in 2008.  A second attempt to incorporate a smaller section of the northwest corner of the town (filed in March 2009) was approved by the court on September 17, 2009 and was enacted with the incorporation of the Village of Bristol that year.

On June 29, 2010, in a special election, most of the remainder of the town of Bristol was annexed to the village of Bristol (effective July 4, 2010), while a small section of the town was annexed to the village of Pleasant Prairie. The town of Bristol ceased to exist.

Geography
According to the United States Census Bureau, in 2000 the town had a total area of 35.0 square miles (90.8 km2), of which, 34.7 square miles (89.9 km2) of it was land and 0.3 square miles (0.9 km2) of it (0.97%) was water. Bristol has a variety of neighborhoods, including country estates, lake homes, subdivisions, condominiums, row homes, and working agricultural areas.

Demographics
As of the census of 2000, there were 4,538 people, 1,715 households, and 1,260 families residing in the town. The population is growing quite a bit. The racial makeup of the town was 97.44% White, 0.29% African American, 0.11% Native American, 0.90% Asian, 0.09% Pacific Islander, 0.66% from other races, and 0.51% from two or more races. Hispanic or Latino of any race were 2.38% of the population.

There were 1,715 households, out of which 33.6% had children under the age of 18 living with them, 62.7% were married couples living together, 7.6% had a female householder with no husband present, and 26.5% were non-families. 22.3% of all households were made up of individuals, and 9.9% had someone living alone who was 65 years of age or older.  The average household size was 2.65 and the average family size was 3.10.

In the town the population was spread out, with 25.9% under the age of 18, 7.1% from 18 to 24, 29.3% from 25 to 44, 25.3% from 45 to 64, and 12.5% who were 65 years of age or older.  The median age was 39 years. For every 100 females there were 96.9 males.  For every 100 females age 18 and over, there were 93.0 males.

The median income for a household in the town was $54,661, and the median income for a family was $63,018. Males had a median income of $44,073 versus $28,932 for females. The per capita income for the town was $24,454.  About 1.6% of families and 2.2% of the population were below the poverty line, including 2.4% of those under age 18 and 1.3% of those age 65 or over.

References

Geography of Kenosha County, Wisconsin
2010 disestablishments in Wisconsin
Former populated places in Wisconsin
Populated places disestablished in 2010